Teenage Book Club is a weekly primetime television series on ABC which aired from August 27 to October 29, 1948. It was a discussion program about books for teenagers which aired on Friday evenings.

In the show, a panel of participants discussed Hamlet and David Copperfield, as well Your Manners Are Showing: The Handbook of Teenage Knowhow by Betty Betz. The show lasted for three months and was not a success.

See also
1948-49 United States network television schedule

References

External links
 Teenage Book Club at IMDB

Black-and-white American television shows
1948 American television series debuts
1948 American television series endings
American Broadcasting Company original programming